Noman Habib is a Pakistani actor.

Career
Noman Habib Khan made his debut with the television serial Yeh Zindagi Hai in which he played the role of "Bhola". Noman Habib Khan also appeared in the television show "Nachley" which was aired on ARY Digital. In 2013, he made his Lollywood debut in the film Main Hoon Shahid Afridi for which he was nominated for ARY Film Award for Best Supporting Actor and ARY Film Award for Best Star Debut Male. Noman Habib Khan has also appeared in the television serial Bunty I Love You with Saba Qamar In 2014, he appeared in an Indian television serial "Parwaz" which was aired on Zee TV.

Filmography

Television

Nominations

|-
| style="text-align:center;"|2014
| rowspan="1" style="text-align:center;"| Main Hoon Shahid Afridi
| ARY Film Award for Best Supporting Actor
|
|-
| style="text-align:center;"|2014
| rowspan="1" style="text-align:center;"| Main Hoon Shahid Afridi
| ARY Film Award for Best Star Debut Male
|

References

Living people
21st-century Pakistani male actors
Pakistani male models
Pakistani male film actors
Pakistani male television actors
Place of birth missing (living people)
Male actors from Karachi
1985 births